Glycyl endopeptidase (papaya peptidase B, papaya proteinase IV, glycine-specific proteinase, chymopapain, Papaya proteinase 4, PPIV, chymopapain M) is an enzyme. This enzyme catalyses the following chemical reaction

 Preferential cleavage: Gly-, in proteins and small molecule substrates

This enzyme is isolated from the papaya plant, Carica papaya.

References

External links 
 

EC 3.4.22